The 1981–82 British Ice Hockey season featured the Northern League, the Inter-City League and English League North.

Dundee Rockets won the Northern League, Blackpool Seagulls won the English League North and Streatham Redskins won the Inter-City League. Murrayfield Racers won the British Championship.

Northern League

English League North

Inter-City League

British Championship

Semi-finals
Streatham Redskins	bt	Murrayfield Racers	9-5
Dundee Rockets	bt	Blackpool Seagulls	16-4

Final
Dundee Rockets	bt	Streatham Redskins	3-2

Ben Truman Southern Cup

Results

Autumn Cup

Results
Quarterfinals
Billingham Bombers 6 - Durham Wasps' 7 (OT)
Fife Flyers 7 - Glasgow Dynamos 6
Dundee Rockets' 14 - Ayr Bruins 2
Whitley Warriors 3 - Murrayfield Racers 11
Semifinals
Durham Wasps 9 - Fife Flyers 4
Dundee Rockets 9 - Murrayfield Racers 8
Final
Durham Wasps - Dundee Rockets 4:7, 7:8

References

British
1981 in English sport
1982 in English sport
1981 in Scottish sport
1982 in Scottish sport